Guy is an unincorporated community in Warren County, Kentucky, United States.

A post office was established in the community in 1912, and named for local resident William Guy Thomas.

References

Unincorporated communities in Warren County, Kentucky
Unincorporated communities in Kentucky